Leonard Sillman's New Faces of 1968 is a 1968 musical revue produced by Leonard Sillman. The original production included Madeline Kahn and Robert Klein.

The play was profiled in the William Goldman book The Season: A Candid Look at Broadway.

External links

References

1968 musicals
Revues